Chloropaschia granitalis is a species of snout moth in the genus Chloropaschia. It was described by Cajetan Felder, Rudolf Felder and Alois Friedrich Rogenhofer in 1875 and is known from Brazil.

References

Moths described in 1875
Epipaschiinae
Taxa named by Alois Friedrich Rogenhofer